Ben-Zion Alfes (1851-1941) was a rabbi, author and Jewish orator. His most well-known book is Maaseh Alfes. The last work he saw published, written at age 90, was an autobiography titled "The Life Story of the Maase Alfes." Another work, Toledot ve-Zikhronot, also an autobiography, but with a different focus, was published posthumously.

Biography
Ben-Zion Alfes was born in Vilna to Rabbi Yirmeyahu Akiva on the first of Kislev 5611 (1851)." After studying with his father until the age of 15, he enrolled in  Eishyshok yeshiva, where he became close to the son-in-law of Rabbi Avraham, brother of the Vilna Gaon. In 1872, he traveled to Palestine in the hopes of settling there but could find no source of livelihood. Upon returning to Vilna, he found work as a proof-reader at HaChevra Metz publishing house. An attempt at writing books for Jewish youngsters was the beginning of his writing career, especially since he received a Haskama
from the Chofetz Chaim. He also translated many  religious Hebrew works into Yiddish. His name also became well known due to public lectures and a network of schools,  Toras Chesed, established for orphans and children from impoverished backgrounds.

In 1925, he returned to Palestine and settled in Petah Tikvah, where he became spiritual director of the Tiferet Bachurim society.

He and his wife Nechama had six children:
 Esther (1869-1956) Rabin
 Shepsl (1872-1956) Alfes
 Mordechai (1877-1942) Alfes
 Dr. Akiva (1879-1962) Alfes
 Sonia Gurwitch
 Malka (1895-1965) Velikowsky

He punctuated his Yiddish-language translations/commentaries on Siddur, as well as Holiday prayer books (Machzorim) with Hebrew vowels, "giving them the external appearance of Hebrew."  This was of major benefit to women whose schooling was in Yiddish language using the Hebrew alphabet. He became known as a pioneer of Orthodox Yiddish literature.

References

Rabbis from Vilnius
19th-century Lithuanian rabbis
Zionists
Yiddish-language literature
20th-century Lithuanian rabbis
1851 births
1941 deaths

he:בן-ציון אלפס